The Southern Indiana Screaming Eagles men's basketball team, also previously known as the Indiana State University-Evansville Screaming Eagles, represents the University of Southern Indiana in Evansville, Indiana, United States. The Screaming Eagles currently compete in the Division I Ohio Valley Conference. Due to the NCAA's policy on reclassifying programs, the Screaming Eagles will not be eligible to compete in the NCAA tournament or the NIT until the 2026–27 season.

The team is currently led by second-year head coach Stan Gouard and play their home games at Screaming Eagles Arena.

Postseason results

NCAA Division II Tournament results
The Screaming Eagles appeared in the NCAA Division II tournament twenty-nine times. Their combined record was 37–30.

CBI Tournament results
The Screaming Eagles appeared in the CBI tournament one time. Their combined record is 0-1.

See also
Southern Indiana Screaming Eagles men's basketball statistical leaders
Southern Indiana Screaming Eagles
Southern Indiana Screaming Eagles women's basketball

References

External links
Website